Matheus Felipe Santos Nascimento (born 9 November 1998), known as Matheus Felipe, is a Brazilian footballer who plays for Athletico Paranaense as a central defender.

Club career
Born in Teresina, Piauí, Matheus Felipe joined Mirassol's youth setup in 2014, aged 15. Known as Matheus Piauí at the time, he made his senior debut on 23 July 2017, coming on as a second-half substitute in a 0–1 away loss against Penapolense, for the year's Copa Paulista.

On 4 February 2020, Matheus Felipe moved to Campeonato Paulista Segunda Divisão side Grêmio Prudente. Later in the year, he moved on loan to Juventus de Jaraguá, playing in the 2020 Copa Santa Catarina and the 2021 Campeonato Catarinense.

On 7 April 2021, still owned by Prudente, Matheus Felipe signed for Série B side CSA until the end of the year. He immediately became a starter for his new side, only missing out two league matches due to suspension as his side narrowly missed out promotion.

On 3 December 2021, Matheus Felipe signed a five-year contract with Athletico Paranaense for the 2022 campaign.

Career statistics

Honours
CSA
Campeonato Alagoano: 2021

References

1998 births
Living people
People from Teresina
Brazilian footballers
Association football defenders
Campeonato Brasileiro Série A players
Campeonato Brasileiro Série B players
Campeonato Brasileiro Série D players
Mirassol Futebol Clube players
Grêmio Esportivo Juventus players
Centro Sportivo Alagoano players
Club Athletico Paranaense players
Sportspeople from Piauí